Mario Fischer (born May 5, 1989) is an Austrian ice hockey player for Vienna Capitals in the ICE Hockey League (ICEHL). He joined the Capitals from EC Red Bull Salzburg on April 26, 2011. 
He participated with the Austrian national teamat the 2015 IIHF World Championship.

References

External links

1989 births
Living people
Austrian ice hockey forwards
Ice hockey people from Vienna
EC Red Bull Salzburg players
SaPKo players
Vienna Capitals players